"Say My Name" is a song by American group Destiny's Child from their second studio album, The Writing's on the Wall (1999). It was written by Beyoncé Knowles, LeToya Luckett, LaTavia Roberson, Kelly Rowland, LaShawn Daniels, Fred Jerkins III, and Rodney Jerkins, featuring production by the latter. While the song features the vocals of the group's original line-up consisting of Luckett and Roberson, the music video for the single marked the introduction of the group's second line-up with then-new members Michelle Williams and Farrah Franklin, whom they were replaced with. It was released as the third single from The Writing's on the Wall on October 14, 1999, by Columbia Records.

"Say My Name" was the most successful of the four singles from The Writing's on the Wall, becoming Destiny's Child's second number-one single on the US Billboard Hot 100 and reaching the top ten in Australia, Belgium, Canada, France, Iceland, the Netherlands, New Zealand, Norway, Poland, and the United Kingdom. Critically acclaimed, the song won two Grammy Awards at the 2001 ceremony for Best R&B Performance by a Duo or Group with Vocals and Best R&B Song, while also being nominated for Record of the Year and Song of the Year.

The accompanying music video for "Say My Name" won the 2000 MTV Video Music Award for Best R&B Video. The song also won a Soul Train Lady of Soul Award for Best R&B/Soul Single, Group, Band or Duo and a BMI Pop Award for Most Played Song. Billboard ranked the song at number seven on their list of the "100 Greatest Girl Group Songs of All Time" and named it the best song of 2000. In 2021, Rolling Stone placed the song at number 285 on its list of the 500 Greatest Songs of All Time while Pitchfork ranked it at number eight on their 2022 list of "The 250 Best Songs of the 1990s".

Writing and production 
"Say My Name" was the group's first collaboration with producer-songwriter Rodney Jerkins, who was one out of several people hired to work with Destiny's Child on their second album. The demo for the track had a different approach and Jerkins said that it was inspired by 2-step garage music he heard while in a club in London. When they wrote the song, however, the lead singer Beyoncé Knowles was initially displeased with the track they were working on. She commented that there was "too much stuff" on the track and it sounded like a "jungle". During the photo shoot for the album, Beyoncé's father-manager Mathew Knowles went to the studio informing her that Jerkins reworked on the track she "hated". He told her to "just have to take a listen to it". When the new mix was played to the group, they liked it.

Music and lyrics 
Lyrically, "Say My Name" has a female protagonist telephoning her lover and suspecting him of cheating. She asks him to "say her name". The young man hesitates, and the narrator believes it is because he does not want the girl he is cheating with to know who she is. Jerkins supported the song's lyrics with a backing track that shifts back and forth in dynamics, steadily bringing different elements, including syncopated, 808 drum programming, synthesized strings and 1970s-style wah-wah guitar licks, in and out of the mix. Knowles sings lead on the verses and bridge and leads the melody of the chorus with Kelly Rowland adding the second part harmony. LeToya Luckett sings the high harmony on the pre-chorus and second chorus. LaTavia Roberson sings second part harmony with LeToya on the pre-chorus and sings the bottom harmony late in the second chorus.

Release 
"Say My Name" was first released in Japan as a maxi-CD on October 14, 1999, containing various mixes of "Bug a Boo" as B-sides. The single was then released in Australia on January 31, 2000, via the same format but with a different track listing that includes the album version of "Bills, Bills, Bills". In the United States, the song began getting radio airplay by select broadcast stations in November 1999. It was later officially sent to urban contemporary radio on January 10, 2000, and was issued physically on February 29, 2000, across four formats: CD, maxi-CD, 12-inch vinyl, and cassette. These "Say My Name" singles have several remixes that were included alongside the original version, including remixes by Timbaland, Maurice Joshua, and Dreem Teem. The Timbaland remix features guest appearances from Static Major and Timbaland himself. Elsewhere, various versions of the single were released in France in March and April 2000, in the United Kingdom on March 27, and in Germany on April 10.

Commercial performance 
"Say My Name" debuted at number 83 on the US Billboard Hot 100. After being released on physical formats, it reached the top of the chart in its 13th week, selling 134,000 copies during its first week of commercial availability. It took longer than any other of Destiny's Child's number-one singles to reach the top. The song spent a total of 32 weeks on the Billboard Hot 100 and was one of the top ten best-selling CD singles of 2000 in the United States. It also reached the top of both the Radio Songs and the Hot R&B/Hip-Hop Songs charts for three weeks in 2000. "Say My Name" is the group's third best-selling single in the US after "No, No, No" and "Bills, Bills, Bills", and was also their third single to be certified gold by the Recording Industry Association of America (RIAA).

In the United Kingdom, it was the group's biggest hit up to that point, peaking at number three on the UK Singles Chart and selling over 190,000 copies. The single enabled the group to break into the Asian market, when R&B music was just beginning to receive strong airplay. In the Philippines, it became the longest number-one single by an R&B girl group, topping the charts for seven weeks. In Australia, it was the second single ever by an R&B girl group to reach number one on the ARIA Singles Chart, after TLC's "No Scrubs", and helped propel The Writing's on the Wall to multi-platinum status.

Music video 

Conflict among members of the group arose in December 1999, following allegations that the group's manager and Knowles' father, Mathew Knowles, was withholding group profits from Luckett and Roberson. They then allegedly asked Knowles for more money; they were dismissed from the group in January 2000. That same month, Mathew Knowles recruited Franklin and Williams to replace both without the signed members' consent or knowledge. The video for "Say My Name" was then filmed with little time for the new members to learn the choreography. The video premiered on February 15, 2000, with Franklin and Williams alongside Knowles and Rowland, on MTV and BET simultaneously with the publication of a press release announcing the line-up change. Luckett and Robersons' vocals still appear on the song, despite their absence from the video. Franklin and Williams' vocals are not included on the track.

The video, directed by Joseph Kahn, shows the four members along with two females and one male dancer singing and dancing in color-coded sets resembling apartment living rooms. Rowland is in blue clothes to match her equally blue room. Knowles is in an orange room, while Franklin is in a red room and Williams in a white room. After the first verse and the chorus, the girls, along with furniture from their respective color-coded sets, switch rapidly between the other members' sets. Soon after the second verse, all girls gather in a garage-like room complete with cars and Destiny's Child in black PVC-pants and orange tops and all of the dancers, dressed in black, from the video.

Legacy 
In October 2011, NME placed it at number 58 on its list "150 Best Tracks of the Past 15 Years" and Pitchfork Media placed it at number 131 on its "The Top 500 Tracks of the 2000s". On VH1's list of the 100 best songs of the 1990s, "Say My Name" was ranked at number 17. In 2021, Rolling Stone placed the song at number 285 on its list of the 500 Greatest Songs of All Time, while Pitchfork, at number 8 on their 2022 list of "The 250 Best Songs of the 1990s".

Jody Rosen from The New Yorker credited Beyoncé's slippery rap-style syncopations in the song with creating a new sound that did not exist in the world before her. He further wrote, "If they sound 'normal' now, it's because Beyoncé, and her many followers, have retrained our ears."

Track listings 

US CD and cassette single
 "Say My Name" (album version) – 4:28
 "Say My Name" (Timbaland remix) – 5:01

US maxi-CD single
 "Say My Name" (album version) – 4:28
 "Say My Name" (Timbaland remix) – 5:01
 "Say My Name" (Maurice's Last Days of Disco Millennium mix) – 7:35
 "Say My Name" (Daddy D Remix with rap) – 4:48
 "Say My Name" (album version featuring Kobe Bryant) – 4:27

US 12-inch single
A1. "Say My Name" (album version featuring Kobe Bryant) – 4:27
A2. "Say My Name" (Daddy D Remix with rap) – 4:48
A3. "Say My Name" (Maurice's Last Days of Disco Millennium mix) – 7:35
B1. "Say My Name" (album instrumental) – 4:31
B2. "Say My Name" (Daddy D Remix instrumental) – 4:48
B3. "Say My Name" (Maurice's Old Skool dub mix) – 7:35

UK CD1
 "Say My Name" – 4:28
 "Say My Name" (Storm Mix by Tariq) – 4:35
 "Say My Name" (Timbaland remix) – 5:01

UK CD2
 "Say My Name" (Dreem Teem club mix) – 5:45
 "Say My Name" (Noodles mix) – 5:17
 "Say My Name" (Maurice's Bass 2000 mix) – 4:20

European CD1
 "Say My Name" (radio edit) – 3:46
 "Say My Name" (Timbaland remix) – 5:02

European CD2
 "Say My Name" (album version) – 4:28
 "Say My Name" (Timbaland remix) – 5:01
 "Say My Name" (album version featuring Kobe Bryant) – 4:27
 "Say My Name" (Daddy D remix without rap) – 4:48

Australian and New Zealand CD single
 "Say My Name" (album version) – 4:31
 "Say My Name" (a cappella) – 4:31
 "Say My Name" (instrumental) – 4:31
 "Bills, Bills, Bills" (album version) – 4:00
 Multimedia

Japanese CD single
 "Say My Name" (album version) – 4:31
 "Bug a Boo" (Refugee Camp remix featuring Wyclef Jean)
 "Bug a Boo" (Maurice's Xclusive Bug a Boo club mix)
 "Bug a Boo" (Maurice's Bug a Dub mix)

Credits and personnel 
Credits are taken from The Writing's on the Wall album booklet.

Studio
 Recorded and mixed at Pacifique Studio (North Hollywood, California)

Personnel

 Rodney Jerkins – writing, all music, production
 Fred Jerkins III – writing
 LaShawn Daniels – writing, vocal production, recording
 Beyoncé Knowles – writing
 LeToya Luckett – writing
 Kelly Rowland – writing
 LaTavia Roberson – writing
 Brad Gildem – recording
 Jean-Marie Horvat – mixing

Charts

Weekly charts

Year-end charts

Decade-end charts

Certifications

Release history

Cover versions 
In July 2020, Dimitri Vegas & Like Mike and Regard teamed up to release a cover of the song.

In 2021, English rapper ArrDee released his third solo single, "Flowers". The song heavily samples the track of the same name by Sweet Female Attitude and interpolates “Say My Name”. It peaked at number 5 on the UK's Official Singles Chart Top 100, spending thirteen weeks in the Top 40, seventeen weeks in the Top 100, with seven of those weeks being in the chart's Top 10.

In popular culture 
In February 2020, the first trailer for the horror film Candyman (2021) was released with a slowed-down version of the song.

See also 
 List of number-one singles in Australia in 2000
 List of Billboard Hot 100 number-one singles of 2000
 List of number-one R&B singles of 2000 (U.S.)

References

Further reading 

 

Destiny's Child songs
1999 songs
1999 singles
2000 singles
Billboard Hot 100 number-one singles
Columbia Records singles
Number-one singles in Australia
Music videos directed by Joseph Kahn
Song recordings produced by Rodney Jerkins
Songs written by Beyoncé
Songs written by Fred Jerkins III
Songs written by Kelly Rowland
Songs written by LaShawn Daniels
Songs written by LaTavia Roberson
Songs written by LeToya Luckett
Songs written by Rodney Jerkins